Bradgate may relate to:

 Bradgate, Iowa, United States
 Bradgate, Rotherham, United Kingdom
 Bradgate Park, a country park in Leicestershire, England
 Bradgate Electoral Division, an electoral division in Leicestershire, England

See also
 Broadgate (disambiguation)